The Surat Split was the splitting of the (INC) Indian National Congress into two groups - the Moderates and Radicals - at the Surat session in 1907.

History 
1885-1906 was known as the period of the moderates because they dominated the Indian National Congress. The Moderates used petitions, prayers, meetings, leaflets, pamphlets, memorandums, and delegations to present their demands to the British government. Their only notable achievements were the expansion of the legislative council by the Indian Councils Act of 1892. This created dissatisfaction among the people. The 1907 INC meeting was to be held in Nagpur. The Radical leaders were not released till that date. Some of the new Radicals came into being with the same policy of prior Radicals.  The Moderates supported Rash Behari Ghosh. Gopal Krishna Gokhale moved the meeting place from Nagpur to Surat fearing that in Nagpur, Bal Gangadhar Tilak would win. The partition of the Bengal Presidency drove the rise of radicalism in INC.
 
Surat was in Bombay Presidency/Province, Tilak's birthplace. Nagpur Province was the province of British India that covered parts of the present-day states of Madhya Pradesh, Maharashtra and Chhattisgarh, with Nagpur city as the capital. Since Surat was the home province of Tilak, he could not preside over the meeting. Hence it was decided that Rash Behari Ghosh would be president. Radicals protested in the INC meeting as Tilak was not given permission even to speak by pundit Madan Mohan Malaviya. Radicals reacted by throwing eggs and footwear and called for the meeting to be cancelled. The shoes hit not one but two stalwarts: first Surendranath Banerjeea and then Sir Pherozeshah Mehta. Worse, the shoe-throwing was followed by a pandemonium in which Radicals threw chairs at the dais and hit their rivals with sticks. The Moderates held a secret meeting and decided to expel the radicals.

The Moderates and the Radicals patched up their differences for a year, but in 1907 the two groups permanently split up. When they met at Surat for their annual session, they shouted at each other and threw chairs and shoes. The police stopped the meeting.

A further split occurred between Hindu and Muslim nationalists due to the militant nationalism that had long existed, set in place due to the multifaceted culture and tradition. Radicals such as Tilak advocated for the Hindu culture that was prevalent in the country. While he succeeded in creating a strong political identity, he also used Shivaji and Akbar to stimulate religious beliefs as a unifier. To this day, there is a false perception that the Tilak was against Muslims, but he developed a good rapport with Muhammad Ali Jinnah before he joined Muslim League. Jinnah was Tilak's lawyer when the British colonial government charged him with sedition. Muslims were seen by the colonial government as an effective counter-balance to the demands of Hindu independence activists, which influenced them to grant Muslims separate electorates in the Indian Councils Act 1909.

In the light of the split, the Moderates restated the goal of Congress to be the attainment of self-government within the British Empire. The Indian National Congress was also split into two different groups called Moderates and Radicals because Moderates wanted to go against the British peacefully but Radicals wanted to go against the British violently, but the aim of both was to expel or suppress the British Empire from India.

Background
Moderates believed in the policy of settlement of minor issues with the government by deliberations. But the radicals believed in agitation, strikes, and boycotts. Nationalists led by Lokmanya Tilak agitated against the Moderates. The split between these two sections became visible at the end of Congress' Banaras Session (1905). Lokmanya Tilak and his followers held a separate conference and formed the Extremist Party. However they decided to work as a part of the INC. The difference between moderates and extremists widened in Congress' Calcutta Session of (1906) and attempts were made to select one of them as the president. The moderates opposed the resolutions on Swaraj, Swadeshi, Boycott of foreign goods, and National Education and requested to withdraw from the policy laid down in the Calcutta session. But the extremists were not ready to do so.

In Surat Session (1907), The Radicals or Extremists wanted Lala Lajpat Rai or Tilak as a presidential candidate, and Moderates supported Rash Behari Ghosh to be the President. But Lala Lajpat Rai stepped down and Rash Behari Ghosh became the President. The colonial authorities immediately clamped down on the extremists and their newspapers were suppressed. Lokmanya Tilak, their main leader, was imprisoned in Mandalay (present-day Myanmar ) for six years.

See also 
 Early Nationalists

References

1907 in India
Indian independence movement